Hickory Branch is a stream in Cooper County in the U.S. state of Missouri.

Hickory Branch was named for the hickory timber lining its course.

See also
List of rivers of Missouri

References

Rivers of Cooper County, Missouri
Rivers of Missouri